Small Town Rivals is a 2007 South Korean film.

Plot 
Cho Chun-sam and Noh Dae-gyu, now both in their thirties, are old friends who went to the same elementary school. In their school days, Chun-sam was always the ambitious class president, while Dae-gyu had to settle for a role as vice president. Twenty years later their roles are reversed: Chun-sam is now a humble farmer who has assumed the post of village chief in his hometown, while Dae-gyu is the newly elected county magistrate. At first, Chun-sam asks his old friend for favours regarding the development of his village, but these requests are turned down. Later, when Dae-gyu proposes building a nuclear waste disposal facility in the county, Chun-sam leads demonstrations against the plan, turning old friends into bitter rivals.

Cast 
 Cha Seung-won ... Cho Chun-sam
 Yoo Hae-jin ... Noh Dae-gyu
 Byun Hee-bong
 Choi Jung-won
 Bae Il-jib
 Nam Il-woo
 Jeon Won-joo
 Lee Jae-goo
 Kim Eung-soo ... Mr. Kim
 Lee Won-jong (cameo)
 Yum Jung-ah (cameo)

Release 
Small Town Rivals was released in South Korea on March 29, 2007, and topped the box office on its opening weekend with 440,516 admissions.

Critical response 
Yang Sung-jin of The Korea Herald was critical of the film's blend of comedy and politics, saying, "Director Jang has incorporated a political satire into the film, weakening its already fragile comic underpinnings." Kim Tae-jong of The Korea Times made similar comments, saying, "the funny moments often sidetrack from the storyline and do not successfully intermingle with the heavy sarcasm placed on political issues", but also noted, "The two actors deliver impeccable performances of the slapstick variety in the wacky situations they act in."

References

External links 
 
 
 

2007 films
2007 comedy films
2000s Korean-language films
South Korean comedy films
CJ Entertainment films
2000s South Korean films